Géza Morcsányi (28 August 1952 – 4 January 2023) was a Hungarian actor, dramaturg, translator, and university professor. His debut film role was as Endre in the 2017 drama film On Body and Soul, the Hungarian entry for Best Foreign Language Film at the 90th Academy Awards. In 2005 he received the Order of Merit of the Republic of Hungary.

Biography
Morcsányi was born in Budapest, Hungary on 28 August 1952.

Morcsányi began his career as a playwright in the 1986 television drama movie Kaméliás hölgy. As a script editor he worked on two films, the 2001 film Passport and the 2003 comedy drama film Hungarian Beauty.
Résztvett a Pécsi Nemzeti Színház, Déry Tibor: Az óriáscsecsemő c. művének bemutatásában.

Morcsányi was the director of the Magvető publishing house from 1995 to 2005.

Morcsányi died on 4 January 2023, at the age of 70.

References

External links

 

1952 births
2023 deaths
21st-century Hungarian male actors
Hungarian male film actors
Male actors from Budapest